First-seeded Doris Hart defeated unseeded Patricia Ward 6–4, 6–2 in the final to win the women's singles tennis title at the 1955 U.S. National Championships.

Seeds
The seeded players are listed below. Doris Hart is the champion; others show in brackets the round in which they were eliminated.

  Doris Hart (champion)
  Louise Brough (third round)
  Beverly Baker Fleitz (semifinals)
  Dorothy Knode (semifinals)
  Barbara Davidson (quarterfinals)
  Shirley Fry (third round)
  Dorothy Bundy Cheney (first round)
  Barbara Breit (semifinals)

Draw

Key
 Q = Qualifier
 WC = Wild card
 LL = Lucky loser
 r = Retired

Final eight

References

1955
1955 in women's tennis
1955 in American women's sports
Women's Singles